Perianthomega is a genus of flowering plants belonging to the family Bignoniaceae.

Its native range is Bolivia to Brazil.

Species:
 Perianthomega vellozoi Bureau

References

Bignoniaceae
Bignoniaceae genera